Iskolat, or formally the Executive Committee of the Soviet of Workers, Soldiers, and the Landless in Latvia, was the governing body in the territory of Latvia that was under control of the pro-Communist Red Latvian Riflemen in 1917–1918.

History
During the Russian Revolution Iskolat was established in Riga on 29–30 July 1917 O.S. (August 11 – 12, 1917, N.S.), at the initiative of the Central Committee of the Social Democratic Party, then controlled by the Bolsheviks with the purpose of carrying out the Bolshevik coup within the territory of Latvia not occupied by Germany. When Germans occupied Riga, Iskolat moved to Cēsis and later to Valka, where it took power over the Valka district, disbanding the organs established by the Russian Provisional Government.

On December 17, 1917 the Congress of Soviets of Latvia convened in Valmiera and elected  as the chairman of Iskolat, who was later replaced by Fricis Roziņš in 1918. 

Iskolat fled to Moscow after German forces occupied Latvia in February 1918 and was disbanded in March 1918.

Historiography
Soviet historiography considered Iskolat to have been the first Soviet government of sovereign Latvia between December 1917 and February 1918, but historian Andrew Ezergailis has shown that autonomy or independence for the "Iskolat Republic" was never the goal for the Latvian Bolsheviks, who were led by the federalist ideologue Pēteris Stučka (Swain 1999: 668–9).

See also
Latvian Provisional National Council
Latvian Socialist Soviet Republic

Notes

References
"Iskolat", Great Soviet Encyclopedia

Political history of Latvia
1917 establishments in Latvia
Early Soviet republics
Former socialist republics
Post–Russian Empire states